C. lepida  may refer to:
Calyptranthes lepida, a species of shrub in the genus Calyptranthes (Myrtaceae)
Carex lepida, a species of sedge
Chrysometa lepida, a species of long-jawed orb weaver spider
Cicindela lepida, a species of tiger beetle
Crataegus lepida, a species of hawthorn

Synonyms
Caudisona lepida, basionym of the snake species Crotalus lepidus